José Arnulfo Ramos Castillo (born 24 December 1974 in Castellón de la Plana, Castellón) is an S7 butterfly and freestyle swimmer from Spain. In 2004, he lived in Artesa-onda, Castellón. He competed at the 2004 Summer Paralympics winning a bronze medal in the 4 x 50 meter 20 points medley relay.

References

External links 
 
 

1974 births
Living people
Spanish male butterfly swimmers
Spanish male freestyle swimmers
Paralympic swimmers of Spain
Paralympic bronze medalists for Spain
Paralympic medalists in swimming
Swimmers at the 2004 Summer Paralympics
Medalists at the 2004 Summer Paralympics
Sportspeople from Valencia
S7-classified Paralympic swimmers